William Henry McCluskey (18 June 1839 – 5 October 1903) was an Irish soldier and survivor of  after it was wrecked in 1852. 

McCluskey was born in Armagh. In 1843 he emigrated with his parents to a farm near Cape Town. By the age of thirteen he had joined the Cape Mounted Rifles and was in this capacity aboard HMS Birkenhead, his unit being sent to fight in the war in the eastern province. According to an account of the incident:

After the wars, he worked unsuccessfully in the gold and diamond fields. In 1877, he was commandeered into the Diamond Field Horse, where he gained the rank of sergeant. His last military action was as a member of the Beaconsfield Town Arms during the siege of Kimberley.

Retiring from the military, McCluskey worked for De Beers as a security guard, at Bultfontein. Here he was beaten to death in October 1903. Michael Mongale was found guilty of his murder but escaped the death penalty due to insanity, instead serving life.

External links
https://web.archive.org/web/20121011231915/http://www.btinternet.com/~palmiped/McCluskey.htm

1839 births
1903 deaths
Deaths by beating
Irish murder victims
Irish soldiers in the British Army
Male murder victims
1903 murders in South Africa
People from County Armagh
People murdered in South Africa
Security guards killed in the line of duty
19th-century Irish people